Partial general elections were held in the southern part of the Faroe Islands on 2 February 1912. The Union Party remained the largest in the Løgting, with 13 of the 20 seats.

Results

References

Elections in the Faroe Islands
Faroe Islands
1912 in the Faroe Islands
February 1912 events
Election and referendum articles with incomplete results